Bruce Nicolas Berger (August 21, 1938 – February 10, 2021) was an American nonfiction writer, poet and pianist. He was best known for a series of books exploring the intersections of nature and culture in desert environments. Berger's book The Telling Distance: Conversations with the American Desert won the 1990 Western States Book Award and the Colorado Book Award.

Life and education

Berger was born in Evanston, Illinois, and grew up in the suburban Chicago village of Kenilworth. He was the only child of Nancy Lander and Robert Oscar Berger, an accountant and Kenilworth's mayor. After public school he attended The Lawrenceville School.  He graduated from Yale University in 1961 with a B.A. in English. Berger did graduate work at the University of California, Berkeley, but did not pursue a doctorate.

Career in music
Berger played piano professionally for three years in Spain, which was the source of his memoir The End of the Sherry.

Essays, articles, and poetry

Berger's articles and essays were published in a number of literary quarterlies. For three years he was a contributing editor at American Airlines' magazine, American Way, and collaborated with photographer Miguel Ángel de la Cueva.

Berger published a poetry collection, Facing the Music.  He was a three-time winner of the Colorado Authors' League Award for Poetry.

Environmental interests

Berger was actively involved in environmental issues and wildlife preservation for the Southern Utah Wilderness Alliance, The Sierra Club, and The Glen Canyon Institute. For twenty years he was a board member of Niparajá, A. C. in Mexico.

Awards and honors
2017: The first foreigner to be inducted into the state writers’ association of Baja California Sur, Escritores Sudcalifornianos, A. C.
2016: The Karen Chamberlain Lifetime Achievement Award in Poetry at the Headwaters Poetry Festival in Gunnison, Colorado.
2014: IPPY Award (silver medal) for The End of the Sherry
2012: Solas Award Grand Prize Bronze for "The Mysterious Fast Mumble" from Travelers' Tales, published in The Best Travel Writing of 2012
2006: ForeWord Magazine Silver Award for Book of the Year in the Nature category for Oasis of Stone: Visions of Baja California Sur, with photographs by Miguel Ãngel de la Cueva
2013: Colorado Authors’ League Award for Specialty Writing for Oasis of Stone: Visions of Baja California Sur
1990: The Western States Book Award for Creative Nonfiction for The Telling Distance: Conversations with the American Desert

Publications
 Hangin' On: Gordon Snidow Portrays the Cowboy Heritage; Northland Press, 1980 
 Notes of a Half-Aspenite; Ashley & Associates, 1987 
 A Dazzle of Hummingbirds; Blake Publishing, 1989  
 The Telling Distance: Conversations with the American Desert; Breitenbush Books, 1990; Anchor /Doubleday, 1991; The University of Arizona Press, 1997
 There Was A River; The University of Arizona Press, 1994
 Facing the Music (poetry); Confluence Press, 1995, (revised and reissued by Conundrum Books, 2015) 
 Almost an Island; The University of Arizona Press, 1998
 Sierra, Sea and Desert: El Vizcaíno; Agrupación Sierra Madre, 1998 
 Music in the Mountains; Johnson Books, 2001 
 The Complete Half-Aspenite; WHO Press, 2005
 Oasis of Stone: Visions of Baja California Sur, in collaboration with photographer Miguel Ángel de la Cueva, Sunbelt Books, 2006
 La Giganta y Guadalupe, with co-author Exequiel Ezcurra and photographer Miguel Ángel de la Cueva, Niparajá, A. C., 2010
 The End of the Sherry, Aquitas Books, 2014
A Desert Harvest: New and Selected Essays, Farrar, Straus and Giroux, 2019

References

External links

1938 births
2021 deaths
Writers from Evanston, Illinois
University of California, Berkeley alumni
Yale College alumni
American male non-fiction writers
20th-century American male writers
20th-century American non-fiction writers
21st-century American male writers
21st-century American non-fiction writers
20th-century American poets
21st-century American poets
Poets from Illinois
American male poets
American pianists
American expatriates in Spain